Brad Elterman is a professional photographer from Beverly Hills, California, who addressed the rock 'n' roll lifestyle in Hollywood encompassing pop, punk and rock bands.  He started his career at the age of 16 taking and selling a photo of Bob Dylan in concert in 1974. He went on to photograph numerous bands and artists of the 1970s, including the Faces with Rod Stewart, David Bowie, Robert Plant, Sex Pistols, the Runaways, Bebe Buell, Kiss, Queen, Blondie, the Ramones, Bay City Rollers, ABBA, Boney M, Kenny Rogers, The Who, Leif Garrett, Michael Jackson, among others. Some of the magazines, newspapers and other publications that he contributed to include Creem, Circus, Rolling Stone, People, Hit Parader, New York Post, National Enquirer, New Musical Express, and Melody Maker.

Elterman describes his photography as focused on the "backstage" aspect of rock 'n' roll stars' lives:

I wasn't a traditional rock 'n' roll photographer because I didn't give a shit about taking a photograph of someone holding a guitar. That's what all the other photographers at the time were doing, and I wasn't interested in those generic concert pictures. I photographed backstage—those were the really exciting pictures that told a story; those were the images that the magazines were craving.

Fall 2010 saw the publication of Elterman's fine art coffee table book, Like It Was Yesterday published by Seventy Seven Press, LLC. The book featured in L'Officiel France, Vogue Brazil, Rolling Stone Brazil, Rocking On Japan, Rolling Stone Japan, MOJO, Monster Children and Vice.

Elterman is continuing to work with fashion brands and to photograph figures from pop and rock culture, including Sunflower Bean, Shawn Mendes, Mac DeMarco, Connan Mockasin, and The Buttertones.  His photos appear in Purple magazine, Purple Diary, Dazed, and Interview. Vice.com publishes his monthly "Le Reve" column.

His third book entitled Dog Dance was published by Damiani editor designed by Sandy Kim with a forward provided by Oliver Zahm.

Filmography

References

External links
 Brad Elterman' Official Global Picture Agency, Buzz Foto (Official Site)
Buzz Foto FaceBook (Official FaceBook page)
Brad Elterman's Twitter (Official Twitter page)
Buzz Foto Twitter (Official Twitter page)
Buzz Foto YouTube (Official YouTube Page)

American male bloggers
American bloggers
American talk radio hosts
American gossip columnists
1956 births
Living people
American male writers
American television personalities
Male television personalities
American infotainers
Photographers from California